Hu Sheng-cheng (5 August 1940 – 10 July 2018) was a Taiwanese economist. He led the Council for Economic Planning and Development from 2004 to 2007 and the Financial Supervisory Commission from 2007 to 2008.

Academic career
Hu studied economics at the University of Rochester in the United States, where he earned a Ph.D, after having graduated from National Taiwan University in 1962. He remained in the United States, and began a teaching career at Purdue University in 1968. While working in the U.S., Hu authored a pair of reports to the Social Security Administration. Hu returned to Taiwan in 1996, teaching at NTU and holding a concurrent appointment at the Academia Sinica until 2001.

Political career
Hu was appointed a minister without portfolio by premier Chang Chun-hsiung in 2001 and had oversight of financial policies. Hu was retained by Chang's successor Yu Shyi-kun when Yu took office in February 2002. Later that year, Yu initiated a six-year development plan devoted to promotion of environmentally friendly industries. He placed Hu in charge of research and development, high value-added industry, and the establishment of an operation center. Upon the resignation of finance minister Lee Yung-san in November, Hu was considered a potential successor. In 2004, he was named the head of the Council for Economic Planning and Development, in addition to his duties as minister without portfolio. After the resignation of Shih Jun-ji in January 2007, Hu was selected to chair the Financial Supervisory Commission. He stepped down in July 2008, and was replaced by Gordon Chen.

Hu later returned to the Academia Sinica as a research fellow. He was an adviser to Wellington Koo's 2014 Taipei mayoral campaign. In August 2016, Hu assumed the chairmanship of the Chung-Hua Institution for Economic Research. He fell ill that same year, and died of pulmonary calcification at National Taiwan University Hospital on 10 July 2018, aged 77.

References

1940 births
2018 deaths
20th-century Taiwanese economists
University of Rochester alumni
Academic staff of the National Taiwan University
Government ministers of Taiwan
Purdue University faculty
National Taiwan University alumni
Politicians of the Republic of China on Taiwan from Yilan County, Taiwan
21st-century Taiwanese economists